Roman Knox (born November 25, 1999) is an American soccer player who plays for the SMU Mustangs.

Career
Knox played with United Soccer League side Swope Park Rangers during their 2018 season from Sporting Kansas City's academy. He made his first professional appearance on June 2, 2018, as a 67th-minute substitute during a 2-0 loss to Saint Louis FC.

Knox has declared he will join the University of North Carolina at Chapel Hill later in 2018 to play college soccer.

In 2021, Knox transferred from North Carolina to Southern Methodist University.

References

External links 
 Sporting KC profile
 

1999 births
Living people
American soccer players
Sporting Kansas City II players
North Carolina Tar Heels men's soccer players
Association football midfielders
Soccer players from Kansas
USL Championship players
People from Shawnee, Kansas
SMU Mustangs men's soccer players
Sportspeople from the Kansas City metropolitan area